An iron puddler  (often merely puddler) was a worker in iron manufacturing who specialized in puddling, an improved process to convert pig iron into wrought iron with the use of a reverberatory furnace.

Working as a two-man crew, a puddler and helper could produce around 1.5 tons of iron in a 12-hour shift. The strenuous labor, heat and fumes caused puddlers to have a short life expectancy, with most dying in their thirties. Puddling was never automated because the puddler had to sense when the balls had "come to nature."

James J. Davis, who was born in Tredegar, Wales, emigrated to the United States, where he later became a prominent figure in government, serving as a U.S. Senator from Pennsylvania and as U.S. Secretary of Labor under three consecutive presidents. His book The Iron Puddler, describing his early experiences as a puddler, was ghostwritten by C. L. Edson.

References

Ironworkers